Caitriona Cuddihy (born 5 December 1986 in Kilkenny, Ireland) is an Irish athlete who was initially selected to compete at the 2012 Summer Olympics in the Women's 4 × 400 metres relay.

References

External links

1986 births
Living people
Olympic athletes of Ireland
Athletes (track and field) at the 2012 Summer Olympics
Irish female sprinters
People from Kilkenny (city)